Johann Sattler (born 1969) is an Austrian diplomat. Since September 2019, he has been serving as the EU Ambassador to Bosnia and Herzegovina.

Biography
Sattler studied Political Science and Slavic Studies at the Universities of Innsbruck, Prague and Moscow. In 1996, he graduated from the Diplomatic Academy of Vienna and joined the foreign service of the Republic of Austria. From 1997 to 1998, he worked as a political officer in Sarajevo and Tirana for the European Community Monitoring Mission (ECMM).

He then occupied various diplomatic posts such as Cabinet Member of the EU Special Representative for South Eastern Europe (Stability Pact) in Brussels (1999–2002), Counselor for Political Affairs at the Austrian Embassy in Washington (2002–2006) and Deputy Head of the Secretary General's Office at the Ministry of Foreign Affairs (2006–2008).

In 2008 he received his doctorate in political science from the University of Vienna.

From 2008 to 2013, Sattler was Managing Director and Publisher for Funke Mediengruppe and Axel Springer in Moscow. He then headed the Western Balkans Unit at the Ministry of Foreign Affairs in Vienna for three years. In 2016, he was appointed Austrian ambassador to Albania.

In September 2019, Sattler succeeded Lars-Gunnar Wigemark as EU Ambassador to Bosnia and Herzegovina.

References

External links

1969 births
Living people
Austrian diplomats
University of Vienna alumni
Austrian officials of the European Union
Ambassadors of Austria to Albania
Ambassadors of the European Union to Bosnia and Herzegovina